This list of double bassists in popular music includes double bass performers from a range of genres, including rockabilly, psychobilly, country, blues, folk, bluegrass, and other styles. In these styles, the instrument is often referred to as an upright bass or a standup bass.

A
 Jeff Ament (Pearl Jam, Temple of the Dog, Mother Love Bone, and others)

B
 Victor Bailey (various bands and artists)
 Barry Bales (Alison Krauss)
 Tom Barney (various artists and bands)
 Didi Beck (German rockabilly band Boppin'B)
 Max Bennett (The Wrecking Crew, Peggy Lee, Joni Mitchell, Frank Zappa)
 Bill Black (Elvis Presley)
 Joe Buck (Hank Williams III)

C

 Ron Carter (jazz)
 Gary Karr (jazz)
 Paul Chambers (jazz)
 Les Claypool (Primus)
 John Clayton (various artists and bands)
 Ernest "Big" Crawford (Muddy Waters, Sunnyland Slim, Little Walter, Memphis Minnie, Jimmy Rogers, Big Maceo, Big Bill Broonzy, Memphis Slim, and others)
 Jim Creeggan (Barenaked Ladies)

D

 Kate Davis
 Patricia Day (HorrorPops)
 Willie Dixon (blues)
 Ted Dwane (Mumford & Sons)

G
 Renaud Garcia-Fons (jazz and world)
 Marshall Grant (Johnny Cash)
 Athol Guy (the Seekers)

H
 Jim Hughart (Tom Waits)
 Clayton Jacobson (Appalachian band the Duck Downpickers)

J
 Eric Judy (Modest Mouse)

K
 Gary Karr (musician and professor)
 Bridget Kearney (Lake Street Dive)
 Dick Kniss (Peter, Paul & Mary, John Denver)
 Geoff Kresge (Tiger Army)

L
 Fred LaBour (country)
 Tony Levin (Bruford Levin Upper Extremities, Liquid Tension Experiment, King Crimson, Peter Gabriel, and others)
 Marshall Lytle (Bill Haley & His Comets)

M
 Joe B. Mauldin (the Crickets)
 Edgar Meyer (various artists)
 Scott Mulvahill (Ricky Skaggs, Bruce Hornsby, Lauren Daigle, solo)

N
 Kim Nekroman (Necromantix)

O
 Patrick O'Hearn (Frank Zappa, Missing Persons, solo)
 Scott Owen (the Living End)

P
 Todd Phillips (numerous bluegrass groups)

Q
 Nate Query (Decemberists)

R
 Missy Raines (numerous bluegrass groups)
 Lee Rocker (Stray Cats)

S
 Russ Savakus (Bob Dylan, Peter, Paul & Mary)
 Esperanza Spalding (jazz)
 Lynn Seaton (jazz)
 Peter Steele (Type O Negative)
 Sebastian Steinberg (Soul Coughing)
 Sting (the Police)
 Djordje Stijepovic (Tiger Army, Drake Bell)

T
 Larry Taylor (Tom Waits, JW-Jones)
 Danny Thompson (Pentangle and others)
 Tillman Franks (Johnny Horton and others)

W
 Jimbo Wallace (Reverend Horton Heat)
 Rob Wasserman (various artists and bands)
 Chris Wood (Medeski, Martin and Wood)

See also
List of contemporary classical double bass players
List of jazz bassists

References